British history provides several opportunities for alternative claimants to the English and later British Crown to arise, and historical scholars have on occasion traced to present times the heirs of those alternative claims.

Throughout this article, the names of "would-have-been" monarchs are in italics.

Abdication of Richard II

Richard II abdicated in favour of Henry Bolingbroke on 29 September 1399. However, Henry was not next in the line to the throne; the heir presumptive was Edmund Mortimer, Earl of March, who descended from Edward III's second surviving son, Lionel of Antwerp, whereas Henry's father, John of Gaunt, was Edward's third surviving son.

Had Edmund inherited instead, the alternative succession would have been short-lived, for it re-united with the historical crown when Edward IV was declared king in 1461.

 Edward III of England
 Edward, the Black Prince, first son of Edward III
 Richard II of England, second son of Edward, the Black Prince
 Lionel of Antwerp, 1st Duke of Clarence, third son (second son to survive infancy) of Edward III
 Philippa Plantagenet, 5th Countess of Ulster, only child of Lionel
 Roger Mortimer, 4th Earl of March, first son of Philippa
 Edmund Mortimer, 5th Earl of March, first son of Roger, died without issue
 Anne de Mortimer, first daughter of Roger, succeeded her childless brother Edmund
 Richard Plantagenet, 3rd Duke of York, only son of Anne
 Edward IV of England, first son of Richard

Descendants of George Plantagenet, Duke of Clarence 

This line's claim to the Crown is based upon the argument that Edward IV was not the son of Richard Plantagenet, 3rd Duke of York, and thus had no legitimate claim to the Crown. Therefore, when Richard was killed at the Battle of Wakefield, his claim passed first to his eldest legitimate son, Edmund, Earl of Rutland, who was executed shortly after the battle, and then to George, Duke of Clarence. Another point is that Henry VI passed a law in 1470 that should both he and his son Edward of Westminster die without further legitimate male issue, the crown was to pass to Clarence, as Henry had placed an attainder upon Edward IV. When Henry VI and Edward both died in 1471, Clarence became the legal heir of the House of Lancaster.

The current descendant of this line is Simon Abney-Hastings, 15th Earl of Loudoun.  The line of succession is as follows:

 George Plantagenet, 1st Duke of Clarence, third son (second "legitimate" son) of Richard, 3rd Duke of York
 Edward Plantagenet, 17th Earl of Warwick, first son of George
 Margaret Pole, 8th Countess of Salisbury, daughter of George, succeeded her childless brother Edward
 Henry Pole, 1st Baron Montagu, first son of Margaret
 Henry Pole, second son of Henry, his elder brother Thomas died in childhood
 Catherine Hastings, first daughter, succeeded her childless brother Henry
 Henry Hastings, 3rd Earl of Huntingdon, first son of Catherine
 George Hastings, 4th Earl of Huntingdon, second son of Catherine, succeeded his childless brother Henry
 Francis Hastings, first son of George
 Henry Hastings, 5th Earl of Huntingdon, only son of Francis
 Ferdinando Hastings, 6th Earl of Huntingdon, first son of Henry
 Theophilus Hastings, 7th Earl of Huntingdon, only son of Ferdinando
 George Hastings, 8th Earl of Huntingdon, second son of Theophilus, his elder brother died in childhood
 Theophilus Hastings, 9th Earl of Huntingdon, third son of Theophilus, his elder brother George had no legitimate children
 Francis Hastings, 10th Earl of Huntingdon, first son of Theophilus, 9th Earl
 Elizabeth Rawdon, 16th Baroness Botreaux, daughter of Theophilus, her brother Francis had no legitimate children
 Francis Rawdon-Hastings, 1st Marquess of Hastings, first son of Elizabeth
 George Rawdon-Hastings, 2nd Marquess of Hastings, eldest legitimate son of Francis
 Paulyn Rawdon-Hastings, 3rd Marquess of Hastings, first son of George
 Henry Rawdon-Hastings, 4th Marquess of Hastings, second son of George, his brother Paulyn died in childhood 
 Edith Rawdon-Hastings, 10th Countess of Loudoun, first daughter of George, succeeded her childless brother Henry
 Charles Rawdon-Hastings, 11th Earl of Loudoun, first son of Edith, died without issue
 Paulyn Abney-Hastings, second son of Edith, succeeded his childless brother Charles
 Edith Maud Abney-Hastings, 12th Countess of Loudoun, first daughter of Paulyn
 Ian Huddleston Abney-Hastings, Lord Mauchline, only son of Edith, died in World War II without issue
 Barbara Abney-Hastings, 13th Countess of Loudoun, first daughter of Edith, succeeded her childless brother Ian
 Michael Abney-Hastings, 14th Earl of Loudoun, eldest son of Barbara
 Simon Abney-Hastings, 15th Earl of Loudoun, eldest son of Michael

Descendants of Mary Tudor, Queen of France

Henry VIII's Third Succession Act granted Henry the right to bequeath the Crown in his Will. His Will specified that, in default of heirs to his children, the throne was to pass to the children of the daughters of his younger sister Mary Tudor, Queen of France, bypassing the line of his elder sister Margaret Tudor, represented by the Catholic Mary, Queen of Scots. Edward VI confirmed this by letters patent. The legitimate and legal heir of Elizabeth I was therefore Anne Stanley, Countess of Castlehaven (the marriage of Lady Katherine Grey having been annulled, and her children declared illegitimate, by Elizabeth I).

Her succession, under this theory, follows:

 Henry VIII of England
 Edward VI of England, only son of Henry VIII
 Mary I of England, eldest daughter of Henry VIII
 Elizabeth I of England, second daughter of Henry VIII
 Mary Tudor, Queen of France, second daughter of Henry VII
 Lady Eleanor Brandon, second daughter, third line of Mary
 Lady Margaret Clifford, only daughter, third line of Eleanor
 Ferdinando Stanley, 5th Earl of Derby, first son of Margaret
 Anne Stanley, Countess of Castlehaven, first daughter of Ferdinando
 George Brydges, 6th Baron Chandos, first son of Anne
 Margaret Brydges, first daughter of George
 George Brydges Skipwith, first son of Margaret
 Elizabeth Brownlow, first daughter of Margaret, succeeded their childless brother George
 George Brownlow Doughty, first son of Elizabeth
 Henry Doughty, only child of George
 Henry Doughty, only son of Henry
 Elizabeth Doughty, only daughter of Henry Doughty Sr

Since Lady Anne Stanley'''s line is thought to have become extinct with the death of Elizabeth Doughty, the line then passes to the descendants of Lady Anne's sister, Lady Frances Stanley:

 Lady Frances Stanley, second daughter of Ferdinando
 John Egerton, 2nd Earl of Bridgewater, first son of Frances
 John Egerton, 3rd Earl of Bridgewater, first son of John
 Scroop Egerton, 1st Duke of Bridgewater, third son of John
 Lady Anne Egerton, first daughter of Scroop
 George Villiers, 4th Earl of Jersey, only child of Anne
 George Child Villiers, 5th Earl of Jersey, first son of George, 4th Earl of Jersey
 George Child Villiers, 6th Earl of Jersey, first son of George, 5th Earl of Jersey
 Victor Child Villiers, 7th Earl of Jersey, only son of George, 6th Earl of Jersey
 George Child Villiers, 8th Earl of Jersey, first son of Victor, 7th Earl of Jersey
 George Child Villiers, 9th Earl of Jersey, first son of George, 8th Earl of Jersey
 Lady Caroline Child Villiers, only child of George's first marriage

Lady Caroline's heir-apparent is her son Timothy Elliot-Murray-Kynynmound, 7th Earl of Minto.

Although the 9th Earl of Jersey had sons from a third marriage, he had been divorced from his first wife, who was still alive when he married his third. Under a strict adherence to the succession laws and customs as they existed in 1603 (for it is argued that no laws passed by Parliament since 1603 are legitimate, as the heirs did not summon those Parliaments, nor did those laws receive the royal assent to become law), the 9th Earl of Jersey's divorce was not valid, and therefore both his remarriage during his ex-wife's lifetime was null and void, and the children of his third marriage illegitimate. Consequently, the current holder of the Stanley claim to the throne of England is the only child of the 9th Earl's first marriage, Lady Caroline Ogilvy (née Child Villiers).

Descendants of Edward Seymour, Viscount Beauchamp

There is doubt of the legitimacy of Edward Seymour, Viscount Beauchamp. Certainly James I regarded the Seymour line as legitimate, and based his own succession on his right by primogeniture, ignoring the Will of Henry VIII. However, the Seymours were placed ahead of the Stanleys in James's line of succession. In 2012, Mary Freeman-Grenville, 12th Lady Kinloss was listed as the heir to the Mary Tudor claim rather than Frances Stanley's descendants.

Her succession follows:

 Henry VIII of England
 Edward VI of England, only son of Henry
 Mary I of England, eldest daughter of Henry
 Elizabeth I of England, second daughter of Henry
 Mary Tudor, Queen of France, third daughter of Henry VII of England, younger sister of Henry VIII of England
 Lady Frances Brandon, first daughter of Mary
 Lady Catherine Grey, second daughter of Frances
 Edward Seymour, Viscount Beauchamp, first son of Catherine
 William Seymour, 2nd Duke of Somerset, second son of Edward, succeeded their childless brother Edward 
 Henry Seymour, Lord Beauchamp, third son of William, his elder brothers William and Robert died in childhood
 Lady Elizabeth Seymour, only daughter of Henry
 Charles Bruce, 3rd Earl of Ailesbury, second son of Elizabeth, his elder brother Robert died in childhood
 Lady Mary Bruce, first daughter, succeeded their childless brothers Robert and George
 James Brydges, 3rd Duke of Chandos, only son of Mary
 Lady Anne Elizabeth Brydges, only child of James
 Richard Temple-Nugent-Brydges-Chandos-Grenville, 2nd Duke of Buckingham and Chandos, first son of Anne
 Richard Temple-Nugent-Brydges-Chandos-Grenville, 3rd Duke of Buckingham and Chandos, only son of Richard
 Mary Morgan-Grenville, 11th Lady Kinloss, first daughter of Richard
 Luis Chandos Francis Temple Morgan-Grenville, second son of Mary, succeeded their childless brother Richard
 Mary Freeman-Grenville, 12th Lady Kinloss, first daughter of Luis
 Teresa Freeman-Grenville, 13th Lady Kinloss, first daughter of Mary

Lady Kinloss's heir-presumptive is her sister Hester Josephine Anne Freeman-Grenville, who is married to Peter Haworth and has three sons.

Continuation of the House of Stuart

The Catholic heirs of the deposed James II of England were passed over by the Act of Settlement 1701.

 Charles I of England
 James II of England, second son of Charles I
 James Francis Edward Stuart, only son of James II; called "James III" by Jacobites.
 Charles Edward Stuart, elder son of James Francis.  He had no legitimate issue by his wife.  He had an illegitimate daughter who has descendants, but they have no succession rights.  Also known as "Charles III" by Jacobites or as "Bonnie Prince Charlie" more widely.
 Henry Benedict Stuart, younger son of James Francis.  He was a Cardinal of the Catholic Church and had no issue. Called "Henry IX" by Jacobites.

At Henry's death the claim passed to his second cousin twice removed, Charles Emmanuel IV of Sardinia, and then to his brother Victor Emmanuel I of Sardinia. Charles Emmanuel and Victor Emmanuel were great-great-great-grandsons of King Charles I.

 Charles I of England
 Henrietta Anne Stuart, youngest daughter of Charles
 Anne Marie d'Orléans, second daughter of Henrietta Anne
 Charles Emmanuel III of Sardinia, second son of Anne Marie
 Victor Amadeus III of Sardinia, second son of Charles Emmanuel
 Charles Emmanuel IV of Sardinia, eldest son of Victor Amadeus
 Victor Emmanuel I of Sardinia, second son of Victor Amadeus
 Maria Beatrice of Savoy, eldest daughter of Victor EmmanuelFrancis V, Duke of Modena, elder son of Maria Beatrice
 Archduke Ferdinand Karl Viktor of Austria-Este, younger son of Maria Beatrice, succeeded their elder brother Francis who had no surviving adult children 
 Maria Theresa of Austria-Este, only child of Ferdinand
 Rupprecht, Crown Prince of Bavaria, eldest son of Maria Theresia
 Albrecht, Duke of Bavaria, second son of Rupprecht, his elder brother Luitpold died in childhood 
 Franz, Duke of Bavaria'', elder son of Albrecht

When Franz dies, his claim on the English and Scottish crowns will pass to his younger brother Prince Max. And after Max's death, this theoretical claim most likely will be inherited by the Prince of Liechtenstein through Sophie, Hereditary Princess of Liechtenstein, daughter of Prince Max.

References

British monarchs
Heirs to the English throne
Succession to the British crown
Rival successions